The Canon EOS M3 is a digital mirrorless camera announced by Canon on February 6, 2015.

Design 
Like its predecessor, the Canon EOS M2, the camera uses the Canon EF-M lens mount.  However, the EOS M3 adds a number of new features, including a contoured grip, tilting LCD touchscreen, built-in pop-up flash and dedicated mode dial. Internally, the EOS M3 sports a DIGIC 6 image processor, 24.2 megapixel APS-C sensor, Hybrid CMOS AF III 49-point autofocus system, image stabilisation, and integrated Wi-Fi and NFC enabling control of the camera via a smartphone app.

The camera supports optional accessories including the Canon Speedlite line of external flashes and the EVF-DC1 external electronic viewfinder.

Sales 
The EOS M3 became available in Europe and Asia in April 2015.  The original EOS M3 announcement indicated that the camera would only be available in Europe and Asia. 

On August 27, 2015, Canon announced plans to make the camera available in the United States as of October 2015. At its U.S. launch in October 2015, the EOS M3 was available at $679.99 for the body only, or $799.99 for a kit including the EF-M 18-55mm f/3.5-5.6 IS STM lens.

References

External links 
 Technical Specifications
 Official Website (United Kingdom)

Canon EF-M-mount cameras